Schloss Hausen is a German castle and stately home in Oberaula.

Hausen Schloss
Buildings and structures in Schwalm-Eder-Kreis